Havelock is the name of several schools:

In England
Havelock School in Grimsby

In Canada:
Havelock Elementary School in New Brunswick

In New Zealand:
Havelock School, New Zealand in Havelock, Marlborough
Havelock North Primary School, Havelock North Intermediate and Havelock North High School in Havelock North.